Elijah Anuoluwapo Oluwaferanmi Oluwatomi Oluwalana Ayomikulehin Adebayo (born 7 January 1998) is an English professional footballer who plays as a forward for Luton Town.

Career
Adebayo joined Fulham at under-9 level, and spent loan spells with Slough Town and Bognor Regis Town. He moved on loan to Cheltenham Town in January 2018.

On 7 July 2018, Adebayo joined League Two side Swindon Town on a season-long loan. On 31 January 2019 he moved on loan to Stevenage.

He was released by Fulham at the end of the 2018–19 season. Following his release he signed for Walsall in June 2019.

On 1 February 2021, Adebayo signed for Championship side Luton Town for an undisclosed fee. He scored on his first start in a 1–1 draw against Millwall on 23 February 2021.

Personal life
Adebayo was born in England and is of Nigerian descent.

Style of play
Primarily a forward, Adebayo has also played as a central defender.

Career statistics

References

1998 births
Living people
Footballers from the London Borough of Brent
English footballers
Association football forwards
Fulham F.C. players
Slough Town F.C. players
Bognor Regis Town F.C. players
Cheltenham Town F.C. players
Swindon Town F.C. players
Stevenage F.C. players
Walsall F.C. players
Luton Town F.C. players
Southern Football League players
English Football League players
Black British sportsmen
English people of Nigerian descent